Untouchables or The Untouchables may refer to:

American history
 Untouchables (law enforcement), a 1930s American law enforcement unit led by Eliot Ness
 The Untouchables (book), an autobiography by Eliot Ness and Oscar Fraley
 The Untouchables (film), a 1987 feature film directed by Brian De Palma, based on Ness's book

Music
 Untouchables (punk band), an American hardcore punk band
 The Untouchables (Los Angeles band), an American ska and soul band
 The Untouchables, an English progressive rock band formed by Adrian Smith

Albums
 Untouchables (album), by Korn
 Untouchables, by Lakeside

Songs
 "Untouchables", by Toya from her 2001 self-titled album, Toya
 "Untouchables", by DJ Kay Slay from The Streetsweeper, Vol. 2
 "The Untouchables", by Kenny "Dope" Gonzalez
 "The Untouchables", by Frank Zappa from Broadway the Hard Way

Television
 The Untouchables (1959 TV series), based on Ness's book, starring Robert Stack
 The Untouchables (1993 TV series), based on the 1987 film, starring Tom Amandes
 "The Untouchables" (The Professionals), a 1983 episode of the crime-action drama series

Other
 The Untouchables: Who Were They? And Why they Became Untouchables, a 1948 history book by B. R. Ambedkar
 Untouchables, a fictional organization in comic books, see list of DC Comics teams and organizations
 The Untouchables (video game), a video game based on the 1987 film
 The Untouchables (wrestling), the tag team Deuce 'n Domino
 Untouchables, the lowest Hindu caste group

See also
 Untouchable (disambiguation)
 Untouchability, ostracising of a minority group